Hileithia nacobora is a moth in the family Crambidae. It was described by Harrison Gray Dyar Jr. in 1914. It is found in Panama.

The wingspan is about 14 mm. The wings are white, tinged with creamy and with small costal dots. The lines are slender and blackish. There is a dusky shade between the inner and outer lines of the hindwings.

References

Moths described in 1914
Spilomelinae